Rhamnella is a genus of plant in the family Rhamnaceae.

Species include:
Rhamnella caudata Merr. & Chun 
Rhamnella forrestii W.W.Sm. 
Rhamnella franguloides (Maxim.) Weberb.  
Rhamnella gilgitica Mansf. & Melch.  
Rhamnella julianae C.K.Schneid. 
Rhamnella martinii (H.Lév.) C.K.Schneid.  
Rhamnella rubrinervis (H.Lév.) Rehder
Rhamnella intermedia Z. Qiang Lu & Y. Shuai Sun, sp. nov. 
Rhamnella wilsonii C.K.Schneid.

References

 
Rhamnaceae genera
Taxonomy articles created by Polbot